Brunei and Cambodia established diplomatic relations in 1992. Brunei has an embassy in Phnom Penh, and Cambodia has an embassy in Bandar Seri Begawan. Both countries co-operate in trade, education and defence.

History 
Relations between the two countries has been established since 9 June 1992. In 2012, His Majesty The Sultan of Brunei attended the 21st ASEAN Summit which been held in Phnom Penh while Prime Minister Hun Sen attended the Royal Wedding of the daughter of Bolkiah, HRH Princess Hajah Hafizah Sururul Bolkiah in the same year.

Economic relations 
Currently, both countries have a good diplomatic relations and the President of the Cambodia's National Assembly Heng Samrin has urged Brunei to look into Cambodia's potential for trade and investment co-operation. In tourism, approximately 560 Bruneians has visited Cambodia in 2012. Brunei also support the development of Cambodia. Both countries has signed an agreement on the rice imported in which Cambodian would export a high quality rice to Brunei. Many Bruneians tourists and investors has interested to travel and doing business in Cambodia due to the peace and political stability on Cambodia in the present.

Security relations 
There is also a co-operation between the Royal Brunei Navy and Royal Cambodian Navy in security with both countries exchange views on the current development in the bilateral defence relations. Brunei also assisting Cambodia in the English Language Courses which offered by the Brunei Darussalam's Ministry of Defence to the Royal Cambodian Armed Forces and Cambodia has participated on the Brunei International Shooting Skills Arms Meet (BISAM) and the ASEAN Armies Rifles' Meeting (AARM).

Further reading 
 Cambodia looks to strengthen relations The Brunei Times
 His Majesty lauds Brunei-Cambodia ties China Embassy in Brunei
 Senior Minister HOR Namhong Meets with Brunei Ambassador Ministry of Foreign Affairs and International Cooperation (Cambodia)

See also  
 Foreign relations of Brunei
 Foreign relations of Cambodia

References 

Cambodia
Bilateral relations of Cambodia